"People power" is a political term.

People power or People Power may refer to:

 People Power Revolution, the Philippine Revolution of 1986
 8888 Uprising in Myanmar, also known as the People Power Uprising in 1988
 People Power Party (disambiguation), several political parties
 People Power Company (or People Power), an American technology company
 People & Power, a current affairs TV programme on Al Jazeera English 
 People Power Monument, Quezon City, Philippines
 the term given by Indonesians for May 2019 Jakarta protests and riots as an effort to step down Joko Widodo from his presidency
People Power: the Game of Civil Resistance, video game

See also
People's Power Party (disambiguation)
Peoples Power Assemblies, an advocacy group based in Manhattan, New York
People Powered Vehicle
Power to the People (disambiguation)
National Assembly of People’s Power, the legislative parliament of the Republic of Cuba